Dicronorhina cavifrons  is a species of beetle in the subfamily Cetoniinae of the family Scarabaeidae. It is native to Ghana, Ivory Coast and Togo.

References
  Biolib

Cetoniinae
Beetles described in 1841